Waldrada or Walderada (French Waldrade, Italian Gualdrada) is a feminine given name of Germanic origin. 

It may refer to:

 Waldrada (531–572), Lombard princess and Frankish queen
 Waldrada of Worms (born 801), wife of Conrad II of Transjurane Burgundy
 Waldrada of Lotharingia (fl. 855–66), the concubine of Lothair II
 Waldrada of Tuscany (died 997), dogaressa of Venice

See also